Annie M. Lowrey (born July 22, 1984) is an American journalist who writes on politics and economic policy for The Atlantic. Previously, Lowrey covered economic policy for the New York Times and prior to that was the Moneybox columnist for Slate. She was also a staff writer for the Washington Independent and served on the editorial staffs of Foreign Policy and The New Yorker. She is a leading proponent of universal basic income.

Lowrey joined Slate in 2010 as part of an effort to revamp their coverage of business and the economy.  Lowrey has appeared as a guest on the PBS Newshour, The Rachel Maddow Show, Morning Joe, Up with Steve Kornacki, and Bloggingheads.tv.

Personal life 
Lowrey attended Harvard University. While at Harvard, she wrote for the Harvard Crimson.

Lowrey is married to Ezra Klein, the co-founder of Vox and currently a columnist and podcast host at the New York Times. They have two children, the first born in February 2019 and the second in fall 2021.  In 2022, Lowrey wrote about how each of her pregnancies involved significant health complications.

Writings 
In 2018, Lowrey published her first book, titled Give People Money: How a Universal Basic Income Would End Poverty, Revolutionize Work, and Remake the World. It was shortlisted for the 2018 Financial Times and McKinsey Business Book of the Year Award.

References

External links

1984 births
American business and financial journalists
American women journalists
Living people
The Harvard Crimson people
The New York Times writers
The New Yorker editors
Women magazine editors
21st-century American women writers
21st-century American non-fiction writers
Women business and financial journalists
Universal basic income writers